Lestignathus is a genus of beetles in the family Carabidae, containing the following species:

 Lestignathus cursor Erichson, 1842
 Lestignathus foveatus Sloane, 1920
 Lestignathus pieperi Baher, 2000
 Lestignathus simsoni Bates, 1878

References

Licininae